Pietro Pontio (or Ponzio; March 25, 1532 – December 27, 1596) was an Italian theorist and composer.

Pontio was born and died in Parma.  He is best known for his 1588 treatise Ragionamento di Musica, which is thought to have influenced Claudio Monteverdi.

External links
 
 Ragionamento di Musica

Further reading
 The Voice of the Composer: Theory and Practices in the works of Pietro Pontio Russell Eugene Murray Jr. 1989

16th-century Italian composers

Italian male composers
1532 births
1596 deaths
Italian music theorists